Jan Hájek was the defending champion, but he was eliminated by Mikhail Youzhny in the second round.
Yuri Schukin won this title, after defeating Flavio Cipolla 6–4, 4–6, 6–0 in the final.

Seeds

Draw

Finals

Top half

Bottom half

External Links
 Main Draw
 Qualifying Draw

UniCredit Czech Open - Singles
2011 Singles